Brumunddal is a town in Ringsaker Municipality in Innlandet county, Norway. The town is the administrative centre of the municipality. The town is a small, densely populated area surrounded by countryside and farms. It is situated at the mouth of river Brumunda, running from the highlands into lake Mjøsa. Brumunddal Church is located in the village.

This makes it the largest settlement in all of Ringsaker municipality.

The dominant industries are agriculture, ore refining, and tourism. Tine also has a large production facility in the town. Brumunddal is the hometown of the woman behind one of Norway's most popular frozen pizza brands, Grandiosa. The local football team is Brumunddal Fotball.

Mjøstårnet, the world's tallest glulam structure, an 18-storey building, is in Brumunddal.

Notable people

See also
List of towns and cities in Norway

References

Ringsaker
Cities and towns in Norway
Populated places in Innlandet
2010 establishments in Norway